Nunhead Cemetery is one of the Magnificent Seven cemeteries in London, England. It is perhaps the least famous and celebrated of them. The cemetery is located in Nunhead in the London Borough of Southwark and was originally known as All Saints' Cemetery. Nunhead Cemetery was consecrated in 1840 and opened by the London Cemetery Company. It is a Local Nature Reserve.

Location
The Main Gate (North Gate) is located on Linden Grove (near the junction with Daniel's Road) and the South Gate is located on Limesford Road. The cemetery is in the London Borough of Southwark, SE15.

History and description
Consecrated in 1840, with an Anglican chapel designed by Thomas Little, it is one of the Magnificent Seven Victorian cemeteries established in a ring around what were then the outskirts of London. The first burial was of Charles Abbott, a 101-year-old Ipswich grocer; the last burial was of a volunteer soldier who became a canon of Lahore Cathedral. The first grave in Nunhead was dug in October 1840. The average annual number of burials over the ten years 1868–1878 was 1685: 1350 in the consecrated, and 335 in the unconsecrated ground.

In the cemetery were reinterred remains removed, in 1867 and 1933, from the site of the demolished St Christopher le Stocks church in the City of London.

The cemetery contains examples of the imposing monuments to the most eminent citizens of the day, which contrast sharply with the small, simple headstones marking common or public burials. By the middle of the 20th century the cemetery was nearly full, and so was abandoned by the United Cemetery Company. With the ensuing neglect, the cemetery gradually changed from lawn to meadow and eventually to woodland. It is now a Local Nature Reserve and Site of Metropolitan Importance for wildlife, populated with songbirds, woodpeckers and tawny owls.
A lack of care and cash surrendered the graves to the ravages of nature and vandalism, but in the early 1980s the Friends of Nunhead Cemetery was formed to renovate and protect the cemetery.

The cemetery was reopened in May 2001 after an extensive restoration project funded by Southwark Council and the Heritage Lottery Fund. Fifty memorials were restored along with the Anglican Chapel.

Notable burials

 Sir Frederick Abel, 1827–1902, co-inventor of Cordite
 Robert Abel, 1857–1936, England test cricketer
 George John Bennett, 1800–1879, English Shakespearian actor
 William Brough, 1826–1870, writer and playwright
 Joseph Lemuel Chester, 1821–1882, American genealogist, poet and editor
 Bryan Donkin, 1768–1855, engineer who developed a paper-making machine and food-canning process
 Edward John Eliot, 1782–1863, Peninsular War soldier
 Vincent Figgins, 1766–1844, typefounder
 Sir Charles Fox, 1810–1874, civil and railway engineer
 Jenny Hill, 1848–1896, music hall performer
 Sir Polydore de Keyser, 1832–1898, lawyer and Roman Catholic Lord Mayor of London
 Sir George Livesey, 1834–1908, engineer, industrialist and philanthropist
 Cicely Nott, 1832–1900, singer and actress
 John Proctor, 1836–1914, artist, illustrator and cartoonist
 Charles Rolls, 1799–1885, engraver
 Thomas Tilling, 1825–1893, bus tycoon
 Alfred Vance, 1839–1888, English music hall performer

Layout and other structures

At 52 acres, Nunhead is the second largest of the Magnificent Seven cemeteries. Views across London include St Paul's Cathedral.

The Victorian part of the cemetery is currently in a poor state of repair, being best described as an elegant wilderness; locals like to call it a nature reserve. Many areas of the cemetery are fairly overgrown with vines, as visible in newer tourist photos. Numerous tombstones lean to the side. Although the Friends of Nunhead Cemetery are doing their best to restore some parts of the cemetery it is badly in need of care and funding.

The lodges and monumental entrance were designed by James Bunstone Bunning. There is an obelisk, the "Scottish Political Martyrs Memorial", the second monument (the other is in Edinburgh) dedicated to the leaders of the Friends of the People Society, popularly called the Scottish Martyrs, including Thomas Muir, Maurice Margarot, and Thomas Fyshe Palmer, who were transported to Australia in 1794. It was erected by Radical MP Joseph Hume in 1851–52. It is immediately on the right on Dissenters Road, when entering through the North Gate.

A memorial commemorates nine Sea Scouts who died in the Leysdown Tragedy off the Isle of Sheppey in 1912, including Percy Baden Powell Huxford aged 12 (named after, but not related to, Lord Baden Powell). The original memorial, designed by Sir Giles Gilbert Scott, was erected in 1914. Most of this was removed after vandalism, and only the base remains. The present replacement memorial was erected in 1992, on the initiative of the Friends of Nunhead Cemetery.

There are a large number of First and Second World War war graves in the cemetery, the greater proportion (592 graves) being Commonwealth service burials from the former war. Most of those are concentrated between three war graves plots: the United Kingdom plot (Square 89), holding 266 graves, the Australian plot which holds 23 graves, and the Canadian plot (Square 52) which holds 36 graves, including burials of South African and New Zealand servicemen. Those buried in the UK plot and in individual graves outside the three plots are, because of not being marked by headstones, listed by name on a Screen Wall memorial inside the cemetery's main entrance. A second Screen Wall lists 110 Commonwealth service personnel of the Second World War who are buried in another war graves plot (Square 5), and elsewhere whose graves could not be marked by headstones. There is also a Belgian war grave of the First World War.

Gallery 
Nunhead Cemetery is one of the Magnificent Seven. It is one of the two cemeteries located south of the river Thames (the other being West Norwood Cemetery).

References

Further reading
 
 FoNC, Nunhead Cemetery, An Illustrated Guide, Friends of Nunhead Cemetery, 1988, 
 
 
 
 
 
 
 
 
 Zisenis, Marcus, Nunhead Cemetery, London, United Kingdom: a case study of the assessment of the nature conservation value of an urban woodland and associated habitats, M.Sc. in Conservation dissertation, University College London, University of London, 1993, unpublished .

External links

 Friends of Nunhead Cemetery website
 Aerial view from 1939, from the English Heritage "Britain from Above" archive

Transport
The cemetery is easily reached with public transport via local buses and National Rail:
 Bus: 78, 343 and 484 all have stops nearby
 Train: The Nunhead railway station is close by.

Cemeteries in London
Parks and open spaces in the London Borough of Southwark
 
Local nature reserves in Greater London
Nature reserves in the London Borough of Southwark
Anglican cemeteries in the United Kingdom
Commonwealth War Graves Commission cemeteries in England
Nunhead
Grade II* listed parks and gardens in London